Malonic acid (IUPAC systematic name: propanedioic acid) is a dicarboxylic acid with structure CH2(COOH)2. The ionized form of malonic acid, as well as its esters and salts, are known as malonates. For example, diethyl malonate is malonic acid's diethyl ester. The name originates from the Greek word μᾶλον (malon) meaning 'apple'.

History
Malonic acid is a naturally occurring substance found in many fruits and vegetables. There is a suggestion that citrus fruits produced in organic farming contain higher levels of malonic acid than fruits produced in conventional agriculture.

Malonic acid was first prepared in 1858 by the French chemist Victor Dessaignes via the oxidation of malic acid.

Structure and preparation
The structure has been determined by X-ray crystallography and extensive property data including for condensed phase thermochemistry are available from the National Institute of Standards and Technology.
A classical preparation of malonic acid starts from chloroacetic acid:

Sodium carbonate generates the sodium salt, which is then reacted with sodium cyanide to provide the sodium salt of cyanoacetic acid via a nucleophilic substitution. The nitrile group can be hydrolyzed with sodium hydroxide to sodium malonate, and acidification affords malonic acid. Industrially, however, malonic acid is produced by hydrolysis of dimethyl malonate or diethyl malonate. It has also been produced through fermentation of glucose.

Organic reactions
Malonic acid reacts as a typical carboxylic acid: forming amide, ester, anhydride, and chloride derivatives. Malonic anhydride can be used as an intermediate to mono-ester or amide derivatives, while malonyl chloride is most useful to obtain diesters or diamides. 
In a well-known reaction, malonic acid condenses with urea to form barbituric acid. Malonic acid may also be condensed with acetone to form Meldrum's acid, a versatile intermediate in further transformations. The esters of malonic acid are also used as a −CH2COOH synthon in the malonic ester synthesis.

Additionally, the coenzyme A derivative of malonate, malonyl-CoA, is an important precursor in fatty acid biosynthesis along with acetyl CoA. Malonyl CoA is formed from acetyl CoA by the action of acetyl-CoA carboxylase, and the malonate is transferred to an acyl carrier protein to be added to a fatty acid chain.

Briggs–Rauscher reaction
Malonic acid is a key component in the Briggs–Rauscher reaction, the classic example of an oscillating chemical reaction.

Knoevenagel condensation
In Knoevenagel condensation, malonic acid or its diesters are reacted with the carbonyl group of an aldehyde or ketone, followed by a dehydration reaction.

When malonic acid itself is used, it is normally because the desired product is one in which a second step has occurred, with loss of carbon dioxide, in the so-called Doebner modification.

Thus, for example, the reaction product of acrolein and malonic acid in pyridine is trans-2,4-Pentadienoic acid with one carboxylic acid group and not two.

Preparation of carbon suboxide
Carbon suboxide is prepared by warming a dry mixture of phosphorus pentoxide and malonic acid. It reacts in a similar way to malonic anhydride, forming malonates.

Applications
Malonic acid is a precursor to specialty polyesters. It can be converted into 1,3-propanediol for use in polyesters and polymers (whose usefulness is unclear though). It can also be a component in alkyd resins, which are used in a number of coatings applications for protecting against damage caused by UV light, oxidation, and corrosion. One application of malonic acid is in the coatings industry as a crosslinker for low-temperature cure powder coatings, which are becoming increasingly valuable for heat sensitive substrates and a desire to speed up the coatings process. The global coatings market for automobiles was estimated to be $18.59 billion in 2014 with projected combined annual growth rate of 5.1% through 2022.

It is used in a number of manufacturing processes as a high value specialty chemical including the electronics industry, flavors and fragrances industry, specialty solvents, polymer crosslinking, and pharmaceutical industry. In 2004, annual global production of malonic acid and related diesters was over 20,000 metric tons. Potential growth of these markets could result from advances in industrial biotechnology that seeks to displace petroleum-based chemicals in industrial applications.

In 2004, malonic acid was listed by the US Department of Energy as one of the top 30 chemicals to be produced from biomass.

In food and drug applications, malonic acid can be used to control acidity, either as an excipient in pharmaceutical formulation or natural preservative additive for foods.

Malonic acid is used as a building block chemical to produce numerous valuable compounds, including the flavor and fragrance compounds gamma-nonalactone, cinnamic acid, and the pharmaceutical compound valproate.

Malonic acid (up to 37.5% w/w) has been used to cross-link corn and potato starches to produce a biodegradable thermoplastic; the process is performed in water using non-toxic catalysts. Starch-based polymers comprised 38% of the global biodegradable polymers market in 2014 with food packaging, foam packaging, and compost bags as the largest end-use segments.

Eastman Kodak company and others use malonic acid and derivatives as a surgical adhesive.

Pathology 
If elevated malonic acid levels are accompanied by elevated methylmalonic acid levels, this may indicate the metabolic disease combined malonic and methylmalonic aciduria (CMAMMA). By calculating the malonic acid to methylmalonic acid ratio in blood plasma, CMAMMA can be distinguished from classic methylmalonic acidemia.

Biochemistry
Malonic acid is the classic example of a competitive inhibitor of the enzyme succinate dehydrogenase (complex II), in the respiratory electron transport chain. It binds to the active site of the enzyme without reacting, competing with the usual substrate succinate but lacking the −CH2CH2− group required for dehydrogenation.  This observation  was used to deduce the structure of the active site in succinate dehydrogenase. Inhibition of this enzyme decreases cellular respiration. Since malonic acid is a natural component of many foods, it is present in mammals including humans.

Related Chemicals
The fluorinated version of malonic acide is difluoromalonic acid.

Malonic acid is diprotic; that is, it can donate two protons per molecule. Its first  is 2.8 and the second is 5.7. Malonate or propanedioate compounds include salts and esters of malonic acid, such as
Diethyl malonate
Dimethyl malonate
Disodium malonate
Malonyl-CoA

References

External links 
Calculator: Water and solute activities in aqueous malonic acid

Dicarboxylic acids